In telecommunication, a long line is a transmission line in a long-distance communications network such as carrier systems, microwave radio relay links, geosynchronous satellite links, underground cables, aerial cables and open wire, and Submarine communications cables. In the United States, some of this technology was spun off into the corporate entity known as AT&T Long Distance with the breakup of AT&T in 1984.  Previously, the AT&T Long Lines division of the Bell System provided maintenance and installation of long line facilities for the Bell System's long-distance service.

See also 
 Long-haul communications
 Long-distance calling

Telephony
Communication circuits